Winter for the Adept is a Big Finish Productions audio drama based on the long-running British science fiction television series Doctor Who.

Plot
The Fifth Doctor and Nyssa investigate the mystery of a malevolent poltergeist in a Swiss girls' finishing school.

This episode addresses issues of religious extremism.

Cast
The Doctor — Peter Davison
Nyssa — Sarah Sutton
Alison Speers — Liz Sutherland
Miss Tremayne — Sally Faulkner
Mlle Maupassant — Hannah Dickinson
Peril Bellamy — India Fisher
Lt Peter Sandoz — Peter Jurasik
Harding Wellman — Christopher Webber
Commodore — Andy Coleman
Empress — Nicky Goldie

Notes
This is the first Big Finish Doctor Who audio drama to feature the actress India Fisher. She later went on to play the Eighth and later the Sixth Doctor's audio companion Charley Pollard. It also features Peter Jurasik, better known for his role as Londo Mollari in the television series Babylon 5.
Discussing Nyssa's latent telepathic abilities (an abandoned story arc that was to feature during her time on the television series), she and the Doctor refer to the Xeraphin from the TV serial Time-Flight and the Permian creatures from the audio play The Land of the Dead.

External links
Big Finish Productions – Winter for the Adept

Fifth Doctor audio plays
2000 audio plays
Fiction set in 1963